The R-8 Human Rhythm Composer is an electronic drum machine introduced in 1989 by Roland Corporation, using PCM voices. The R-8 features velocity- and pressure-sensitive trigger pads, and the ability to create loops of beats. The device has eight individual outputs, 12-voice polyphony, and four-part multitimbral MIDI.

The R-8 has one RAM memory card slot for saving user-created patterns and songs, and one slot for PCM ROM cards to augment the internal sound banks.

The R-8M is a rackmount version of the R-8, lacking the trigger pads and the sequencer capability,  but with three front-facing ROM card slots. These sound libraries may be accessed simultaneously. This device was available from 1989 through 1994. The rack version has fewer individual outputs: 6 instead of 8.

In 1992, Roland released a second version of the R-8 drum machine, the R-8 MKII. This version offers greatly expanded memory. The ROM went from 67 to 199 samples. It brought onboard content from the PCM cards SN-R8-01, SN-R8-02, SN-R8-09, SN-R8-10 and most of the 808 samples from SN-R8-04, while losing 22 of the MK1 samples. Another 16 samples from the MK1 returned in a slightly modified version with another name. A minor omission on the MKII is the absence of the Space Invaders boot screen. This device was discontinued in 1996.

Roland also released a trimmed-down version of the R8 in the form of the Roland R-5, which had fewer sounds and features than the R-8

PCM sound cards 
Known Roland ROM cards, each containing 26 samples:
 Roland SN-R8-01 - Contemporary Percussion
 Roland SN-R8-02 - Jazz Brush
 Roland SN-R8-03 - Sound Effects
 Roland SN-R8-04 - Electronic (Contains 11 TR-808 samples)
 Roland SN-R8-05 - Jazz
 Roland SN-R8-06 - Ethnic Percussion 
 Roland SN-R8-07 - Mallet 
 Roland SN-R8-08 - Dry 
 Roland SN-R8-09 - Power Drums U.S.A.
 Roland SN-R8-10 - Dance (Contains 6 TR-909 and 10 CR-78 samples)
 Roland SN-R8-11 - Metallic Percussion

Notable Users 
Drexciya
Pimp C
Autechre
New Order
808 State
Prince
Massive Attack
Jean-Michel Jarre
Aphex Twin
Keith Marquis
Colin Towns
Human League
Jermaine Jackson
PIG
Jimmy Edgar
Noheadchicken live
NTRSN
N-Trance
Orbital
Tangerine Dream
Underworld
The Shamen
Studio Fresh
Anthony Manning

References

Further reading

Drum machines
R-8
R-8
Musical instruments invented in the 1980s
Japanese inventions